Soap Opera is a 2004 Chinese drama film directed by Wuershan and starring Le-yi Chen, Feng Deng, and Hui Zhang. The film won the FIPRESCI Award at the Busan International Film Festival.

Cast
 Le-yi Chen
 Feng Deng
 Hui Zhang

Accolades

References

External links
 

2004 films
2000s Mandarin-language films
2004 drama films
Films directed by Wuershan